Kim Yong-man (born November 30, 1967) is a South Korean comedian. He is currently signed with the entertainment agency, FNC Entertainment.

Education
In 2005, Kim was a student at Sungkyunkwan University's School of Art where he aimed to improve his acting skills for his sitcom, Nonstop 5, having previously studied at Seoul Institute of the Arts in 1992.

Career
In 1991, Kim won the Grand Prize in the National College Comedy Contest, making his official debut in the South Korean entertainment industry. In the early 1990s, Kim was a part of a group of comedians who called themselves Team Potato, composed of Kim Gook-jin, Kim Soo-yong and Park Soo-hong, who all debuted in the same year on KBS. It had been reported that Kim himself had been admitted to hospital due to their busy schedule, and Kim Gook-jin attempted to reason with television program producers to lighten their workload. However, this request was not received well by producers, who permanently banned Team Potato from making appearances on television. As a result, in January 1993, the four comedians planned to leave South Korea for the U.S., taking a break from the South Korean entertainment industry.

In 2011, he hosted the 2011 SBS Entertainment Awards, along with Shin Bong-sun and Kim Won-hee. In 2012, Kim became a CEO when he and comedian Kim Soo-yong started an online website called StarLogin, which allows companies and businesses alike to easily contact South Korean celebrities, including entertainers, singers and comedians, for events such as lectures, festivals or corporate events.

After his gambling scandal, Kim had spent nearly three years inactive in the entertainment industry.

In 2015, he became a cast member of tvN's variety television program, Useful Men, making his first appearance on South Korean television since his career break that he took during his gambling scandal.

In October 2021, Kim decided not to renew his contract with FNC Entertainment.

On November 15, 2021, Kim founded the Matched Project (MCP) agency with Ahn Jung-hwan, Kim Sung-joo, and Jung Hyung-don.

Personal life
In March 2013, Kim was investigated for illegally gambling more than 1,000,000,000 KRW (approximately $900,000 USD) online on sports websites, under his manager's bank account. This could be described as the start of the investigations into other South Korean celebrities such as Tak Jae-hoon and Lee Soo-geun, who, along with Kim, were reportedly encouraged to gamble by an individual from their football club. Kim chose to leave the television programs he regularly took part in, including Vitamin, giving himself time to reflect. Kim was officially charged with gambling 1,300,000,000 KRW (approximately $1,170,000 USD) between March 2008 and May 2011, in April 2013. He was given a one-year prison sentence.

Kim, among other South Korean celebrities such as Kim Won-hee and Song Eun-i, is a part of a volunteer group called God is Love Ministry (GIL Ministry), who raise money to provide medical sponsorships for Haitian children with congenital heart disease to travel to South Korea to be medically treated.

Filmography

Variety shows

Current

Former

Television series

Awards and nominations

References

1967 births
Living people
South Korean male comedians
South Korean television presenters
People from Seoul
Gag Concert
Seoul Institute of the Arts alumni
FNC Entertainment artists